Greetings from the Side is the debut studio album by American singer-songwriter Gary Jules.

Track listing

References

1998 debut albums
Gary Jules albums
A&M Records albums